Arkansas Highway 279 (AR 279 and Hwy. 279)  is a north–south state highway in Benton County, Arkansas. The route runs  from Arkansas Highway 12 at Vaughn north to the Missouri state line through Centerton.

Route description

The route begins at AR 12 near the Northwest Arkansas Regional Airport and runs north to intersect AR 102 in Centerton. These routes form a concurrency west until the Centerton city limits, when AR 279 turns north. AR 279 winds north through rural Benton County until intersecting AR 72 in Hiwasee near the Hiwasse Bank Building, which is listed on the National Register of Historic Places.

The AHTD began construction south of the Highway 72 junction in Hiwasse in May 2011 on a future junction along the Bella Vista Bypass, which is itself part of a long-range project to extend Interstate 49. The route continues north, winding through Bella Vista as Forest Hills Boulevard, serving as the western terminus for Lancashire Blvd in central Bella Vista. Highway 279 heads north to meet Missouri supplemental route OO at the Missouri state line, where it terminates. Route OO serves as a connector to AR 279 to US Route 71.

Major intersections
Mile markers reset at concurrencies.

|-
| align=center colspan=4 |  concurrency west, 
|-

See also

 List of state highways in Arkansas

References

External links

279
Transportation in Benton County, Arkansas